The cabinet of Fredrik Reinfeldt was the cabinet of Sweden from 2006 to 2014. It was a coalition cabinet consisting of the four parties in the centre-right Alliance for Sweden: the Moderate Party, Centre Party, Liberal People's Party and the Christian Democrats.

The cabinet was installed on 6 October 2006, following the 2006 general election which ousted the Social Democrats after twelve years in power. It retained power after the 2010 general election as a minority government, and was the longest-serving consecutive non-social democratic government since the cabinet of Erik Gustaf Boström in 1900. It was led by Prime Minister Fredrik Reinfeldt of the Moderate Party.

Ministers 

|}

Party breakdown 
Party breakdown of cabinet ministers:

New ministries 
Ministry of Employment, belonged to the Ministry of Industry, Employment and Communications in the cabinet of Göran Persson.
Ministry of Culture, belonged to the Ministry of Education and Culture in the cabinet of Göran Persson.
Ministry of Environment was before called the Ministry of Sustainable Development.
Ministry of Integration and Gender Equality, belonged to the Ministry of Justice and the Ministry for Foreign Affairs in the cabinet of Göran Persson.

Policy of the cabinet 

The new government was presented on 6 October 2006. The following reforms were proposed:
 Communication and transportation:
 The tax on automotive fuels will be raised because of inflation adjustment, by 9 öre per litre for gasoline and 6 öre per litre for diesel (excluding VAT).
 Culture:
 The new government plans to reintroduce entrance fees to the country's 21 state-operated museums.
 Third-party liability premiums for vehicle insurance will be raised.
 The current operator's license for the public service broadcasters Sveriges Television, Sveriges Radio and Sveriges Utbildningsradio will come up for renegotiation in three years, instead of six as negotiated with the outgoing government.
 Education:
 The reform of the secondary education (gymnasium) which was to take effect from 1 January 2007 will be scrapped and instead the new government will start planning for a deeper reform to take place some time before 2010.
 Government agencies:
 The following government agencies will be closed down: Swedish Integration Board, National Institute for Working Life, Swedish Animal Welfare Agency and the County Labour Boards.
 All agencies are being scrutinized for reformation.
 Heads of agencies to be made into merit based appointments.
Foreign aid:
 The monetary foreign aid's goal and what countries receiving aid is being reconsidered.

Implemented reforms 
 Working tax cuts
 Considerably raised fees for unemployment funds, linked to the rate of unemployment among the members of each fund (introduced January 2007, abolished January 2014) resulting in large membership losses of unemployment funds and trade unions
 Municipal allowance
 Deduction for certain household services, so-called RUT deduction
 Abolished compulsory military service
 High Schools reforms and new grading system for the entire school system
 Reforming the legal framework of the National Defence Radio Establishment (FRA-law)
 Implemented the Enforcement Directive (IPRED)
Defence Act of 2009
 Abolished the state monopoly on pharmaceuticals 
 Deregulated railroad traffic
 Radio frequencies for mobile broadband in 800 MHz band
 Liberalisation of the Alcohol Law
 Abolition of the Swedish Cinema Office
 Abolition of compulsory student union
 Deductability of gifts to nonprofit organisations
 Reforms of the health insurance system
 Decreased restaurant VAT from 25 to 12 percent, to the same level as for any other food.
 Legalisation of same-sex marriage
Corporate tax rate lowered from 26.3% to 22%.

Controversies and resignations 

On 7 October 2006, the day after the new cabinet was announced two of the ministers, the Minister of Foreign Trade Maria Borelius and the Minister for Culture Cecilia Stegö Chilò, admitted that they had previously employed persons to take care of their children without paying the appropriate taxes. On 11 October 2006 it came to light that Cecilia Stegö Chilò and her husband had not paid their TV license for the last 16 years. On 12 October 2006 it emerged that two other ministers in the cabinet had neglected to pay the television license; Maria Borelius and the Minister for Migration and Asylum Policy, Tobias Billström. Radiotjänst i Kiruna AB, the private agency tasked with collecting the license fee, filed criminal charges against Cecilia Stegö Chilò, Maria Borelius and Tobias Billström.

On 14 October 2006 Maria Borelius resigned as Minister of Foreign Trade. On 16 October 2006, just two days after Maria Borelius' resignation, Minister for Culture Cecilia Stegö Chilò resigned as well.

The Minister for Defence, Mikael Odenberg, resigned on 5 September 2007 as he thought the budget cuts his department would face were to high.

On 29 March 2012 Minister for Defence, Sten Tolgfors, resigned due of his way to deal with the Project Simoom.

Public perception 
In public opinion survey conducted by Aftonbladet/Sifo in late 2006, the Swedish public was asked to rate each of the new ministers on a 5-graded scale. The average result for the 22 ministers was 2.93. This is higher than any of the rates that the Social Democratic Persson cabinet ever received during its years in power, and the highest ratings ever since the surveys started in 1996.

From the 2006 Swedish general election the opinions for the Reinfeldt cabinet have declined steadily from a level of about 51% down to a level about 40%, which election researchers generally explain as more than what could be expected due to normal inter-election popularity fall. Center-right newspapers in Sweden criticize the cabinet for not being pedagogically proficient, while the opposition newspapers just connects the impopularity of the cabinet with the scandals and the performed practical politics.

References

External links 
The Government and the Government Offices of Sweden
Statement of Government Policy (6 October 2006)

2006 establishments in Sweden
Coalition governments
Politics of Sweden
Reinfeldt, Fredrik
Cabinets established in 2006
Cabinets disestablished in 2014
2014 disestablishments in Sweden